Deer Lake is an unincorporated community and census-designated place in Wharton Township, Fayette County, Pennsylvania, United States. As of the 2010 census, the population was 495.

Demographics

References

External links

Census-designated places in Fayette County, Pennsylvania
Census-designated places in Pennsylvania